Narcisseae is a small tribe of plants belonging to the subfamily Amaryllidoideae of the Amaryllis family (Amaryllidaceae), where it forms part of the Eurasian clade, and is one of three tribes in the European (Mediterranean) clade. It contains two genera (Narcissus and Sternbergia) and approximately 58 species, but probably also Lapiedra. The two genera are distinguished from each other by the presence of a paraperigonium in the former.

Description 
Characterised by a solid scape and spathaceous bracts fused into a floral tube (basally connate).

Taxonomy

Phylogeny 
The placement of Narcisseae within subfamily Amaryllidoideae is shown in the 
following cladogram, which demonstrates a sister group relationship with Pancratieae:

Subdivision 
Genera:
 Narcissus L.
 Sternbergia Waldst. & Kitaibel
 (Lapiedra Lag.)

Distribution 
Western Mediterranean, extending east along the Silk Road to Asia Minor, Kashmir, China and Japan.

References

Bibliography

 
 
 
(additional excerpts)
 
  Full text 
 
 

Amaryllidoideae
Asparagales tribes
Taxa named by Jean-Baptiste Lamarck